May Jacks was a British tennis player at the end of the nineteenth century. In 1890 she was the losing finalist in the Wimbledon Ladies Singles Championship, being defeated by Lena Rice 6–4, 6–1.

Only four competitors entered, the smallest entry ever for any competition at Wimbledon. Under the system at that time, Rice should then have played the defending champion, Blanche Bingley, in the All Comers Final, but Bingley did not enter, so Rice had a walkover.

In the same year, Jacks won the inaugural Queen's Club Championship, beating Maud Shackle 6–2, 6–1. The following year she lost to Shackle 6–2, 4–6, 6–3.

References

British female tennis players
Year of birth missing
Year of death missing
Place of birth missing